Simone Sanna (born 16 March 1978 in Florence) is an Italian Grand Prix motorcycle road racer. His best year was in 2000 when he won two Grand Prix races and finished the season ranked sixth in the 125cc world championship. In 2006 and 2007, Sanna raced in the Supersport World Championship.

References 

1978 births
Living people
Sportspeople from Florence
Italian motorcycle racers
125cc World Championship riders
Supersport World Championship riders